The Percophidae, duckbills, are a family of percomorph fishes, from the order Trachiniformes, found in tropical and subtropical waters of the Atlantic and Indian Oceans and in the southwestern and southeastern Pacific.

A few species are fished commercially, including the Brazilian flathead.

Characteristics
The species in the family Percophidae are elongated, benthic fishes with an anteriorly depressed head, a broad flat snout which gives rise to the common name duckbills. The mouth is large with a prognathous  lower jaw  and exposed maxilla. They have large closely placed eyes. There are two spines on the opercula and one on subopercula. They have tiny conical teeth on the mandibles and on the vomer and palatine bones. There are two dorsal fins an anterior dorsal fin with 6 slender spines and a posterior dorsal fin with 13 to 18 soft rays, the pelvic fins have 1 weak spine and 5 branched rays and these are positioned anteriorly to the pectoral fins with their bases widely separated. The anal fin has only 15 to 25 soft rays and the pectoral fins have between 20 and 28 rays. They body is covered in ctenoid scales and the lateral line curves underneath the anterior dorsal fin to below the middle of the flank with the 2 or 3 scales nearest the head being keeled. They are generally brownish in colour with indistinct dark blotches along the body. They are relatively small and uncommon and are of no interest to fisheries.

Subfamilies and genera
The family Percophidae is divided into three subfamilies

 Subfamily Bembropinae 
 Bembrops 
 Chrionema 

Subfamily Hemerocoetinae 
 Acanthaphritis 
 Dactylopsaron 
 Enigmapercis 
 Hemerocoetes 
 Matsubaraea 
 Osopsaron 
 Pteropsaron 
 Squamicreedia 

 Subfamily Percophinae 
 Percophis

Timeline of genera

References 

 
 

 
Trachiniformes
Marine fish families